Margot Grahame (born Margaret Clark; 20 February 1911 – 1 January 1982) was an English actress most noted for starring in The Informer (1935) and The Three Musketeers (1935). She started acting in 1930 and made her last screen appearance in 1958.

Film actress
Her family went to South Africa when she was three years old, which led to her being educated there. She began her stage career in Pretoria, with Dennis Neilson-Terry, a few weeks after leaving school at the age of 14. She made her London stage debut in 1927 as understudy to Mary Glynne in The Terror. Her screen debut was in the 1930 film Rookery Nook.

During the early 1930s, Grahame was gradually becoming a popular actress in Britain. Hollywood producers were impressed that, in only three years, she had appeared in 42 major roles in British films. After she went to America, she was signed to a long-term contract with RKO and performed in a number of movies from the mid-1930s to the late 1950s.

She appeared as the prostitute girlfriend of Gypo Nolan in John Ford's The Informer (1935). She followed this performance with a role as Milady de Winter in The Three Musketeers (1935). She was reunited with Walter Abel, her leading man in The Three Musketeers, a dozen years later in The Fabulous Joe (1947), which was produced by Bebe Daniels. As the character Emily Terkle, Grahame was appearing in her first film since The Buccaneer (1938). Starring opposite Fredric March, Grahame faced the challenge of playing the love interest rather than a siren. She appeared in The Romantic Age in 1949.

Her last films were made in the 1950s and included I'll Get You for This (1951) starring George Raft and Coleen Gray, The Crimson Pirate (1952) starring Burt Lancaster, The Beggar's Opera (1953), Orders Are Orders (1954) and Saint Joan (1957) with Jean Seberg in the titular role. She also appeared in "The Sweater" (1958), an episode of The New Adventures of Charlie Chan (1958).

Personal life
Grahame moved into a home in the Hollywood Hills after her separation from British actor Francis Lister in 1935. She married Canadian millionaire Allen McMartin in 1938. They divorced in 1946. In 1948, Grahame began a relationship with the British literary agent A. D. Peters that continued until his death in 1973. 

In her later years, she was reportedly "full of bitter regret and resentment" at, amongst other things, the fact that Peters had never married her.

Death
In her old age, Grahame was "bloated" and had her hair coloured, in her own words, "'red as flaming fires of hell'". Her housekeeper at the time of her death was Lily (née Budge), wife of the impoverished 13th Earl of Galloway. Grahame died in London on New Year's Day of 1982, aged 70, from chronic bronchitis. She had no survivors and was cremated.

Partial filmography

 Rookery Nook (1930) - Clara Popkiss
 Compromising Daphne (1930) - Muriel
 The Love Habit (1931) - Julie Bubois
 Uneasy Virtue (1931) - Stella Tolhurst
 Glamour (1931) - Lady Betty Enfield
 The Rosary (1931) - Mary Edwards
 Creeping Shadows (1931) - Gloria Paget
 The Innocents of Chicago (1932) - Lil
 Stamboul (1932) - Countess Elsa Talven
 Illegal (1932) - Dorothy Turner
 Forging Ahead (1933) - Crystal Grey
 Timbuctoo (1933) - Elizabeth
 Yes, Mr Brown (1933) - Clary Baumann
 Prince of Arcadia (1933) - Mirana
 I Adore You (1933) - Margot Grahame
 Sorrell and Son (1933) - Mrs. Dora Sorrell
 House of Dreams (1933)
 Without You (1934) - Margot Gilbey
 The Broken Melody (1934) - Simone St. Cloud
 Easy Money (1934)
 Falling in Love (1935) - June Desmond
 The Informer (1935) - Katie Madden
 The Arizonian (1935) - Kitty Rivers
 The Three Musketeers (1935) - Milady de Winter
 Two in the Dark (1936) - Marie Smith
 Counterfeit (1936) - Aimee Maxwell
 Crime Over London (1936) - Pearl - Gang-Moll
 Make Way for a Lady (1936) - Valerie Broughton
 Night Waitress (1936) - Helen Roberts
 Criminal Lawyer (1937) - Madge Carter
 The Soldier and the Lady (1937) - Zangarra
 Fight for Your Lady (1937) - Marcia Trent
 The Buccaneer (1938) - Annette de Remy
 The Hal Roach Comedy Carnival (1947) - Emily Terkle, in 'Fabulous Joe'
 The Fabulous Joe (1947) - Emily Terkel
 Forever Amber (1947) - Bess (scenes deleted)
 Broken Journey (1948) - Joanna Dane
 Black Magic (1949) - Mme. du Barry
 The Romantic Age (1949) - Helen Dickson
 I'll Get You for This (1951) - Mrs. Langley (uncredited)
 The Crimson Pirate (1952) - Bianca
 Venetian Bird (1952) - Rosa Melitus
 The Beggar's Opera (1953) - The Actress
 Orders Are Orders (1954) - Wanda Sinclair
 Saint Joan (1957) - Duchesse de la Tremouille

References

"Margot Grahame Dislikes Depot Change; Cecil B. Demille Talks About Buccaneer." Albuquerque Journal, 24 January 1938, p. 8.
"Bebe Daniels Set To Produce Movie." Charleston Gazette. 16 July 1946, p. 11.
"Margot Grahame Agrees That Luckies Are Gentlest on the Throat." Connellsville Daily Courier, 9 March 1937, Page 3.
"Spring Styles Call For Much Warmer Hues-Margot Grahame." Dunkirk Evening Observer, 11 March 1937, p. 11.
"In England They Call Margot Grahame Second Jean Harlow." Lowell Sun, 28 May 1935, p. 54.
"Sign of Separation." Lowell Sun, 2 November 1935, p. 45.

External links

Margot Grahame at Virtual History

1911 births
1982 deaths
English film actresses
English television actresses
People from Canterbury
Actresses from Kent
20th-century English actresses
British expatriates in South Africa